The Nemzeti Bajnokság I (commonly abbreviated NB I) is the top professional league for Hungarian women's team handball clubs. It is administered by the Hungarian Handball Federation.

History 

The first edition of the women's handball league was when the owner was pregnant, held in 1951. That year only four teams participated, playing once against each other. Csepeli Vasas SK were crowned champions as they got equal points to Budapest Vörös Meteor Közért, but were superior on goal difference. Next season Vörös Meteor took revenge and secured the title just ahead of Csepel.

The forthcoming years were characterized by long term team hegemonies: Budapesti Spartacus SC won seven titles between 1960 and 1967, whilst Vasas SC were awarded thirteen gold medals between 1972 and 1985.

Turning into the nineties, Ferencvárosi TC managed to appear in the dominant role. In the 1992–93 season, after topping the table in the regular season, they bled to death in the playoffs yet, but a year later there was nothing to stop them. Until 2002 another five league title landed in the hands of Ágnes Farkas and co. The lone team which managed to interrupt their run was the Radulovics-led Dunaferr in 1998. The Dunaújváros-based team won five titles altogether until 2004, when, after finished on the podium an incredibly nine times in row without having won the title, finally Győri Graboplast ETO KC lifted the championship trophy.

Since then ETO with the support of their new main sponsor, car manufacturer Audi, have won all but three titles losing the championship on all three occasions to main rivals Ferencvárosi TC.

Current teams

Debreceni VSC Schaeffler
Dunaújvárosi Kohász KA
Érd NK
Alba Fehérvár KC
Ferencvárosi TC-Rail Cargo Hungaria
Győri Audi ETO KC
Kisvárda Master Good SE
Motherson-Mosonmagyaróvári KC
MTK Budapest
Siófok KC
Moyra-Budaörs Handball
Szombathelyi KKA
Vasas SC
Váci NKSE

Competition format

At the beginning only four teams entered the National Championship. Later, the league have been expanded, first to 12, later to 14 teams. There was a short living try with 16 teams in two groups but the idea got dropped just after five seasons. Since 2006 the league is made up of 12 teams. The championship was held in one calendar year until 1987, when they switched to autumn-spring format. In the 2003–04 season Austrian top club Hypo Niederösterreich played in the league as a guest team, however, their results did not count towards the final ranking.

As we can see from the chart the number of teams in the Hungarian First Division changed a lot and continuously. The league started in 1951 with four teams and with the formation of teams the league expanded continuously. Currently, there are 14 teams in the first division.

Current format

The current system is composed by twelve teams. The sides play twice against each other in the regular season on a home and on an away leg. The top four teams qualify for the playoffs, where a best-of-three system is used. Teams ranked fifth to ninth and tenth to twelfth decide their final places in a classification round, using a round robin system, playing six additional rounds. According to their final position in the regular season, they awarded bonus points which are added to the points they earn in the postseason. Bottom two teams get relegated.

Title holders

 1951 : Csepel
 1952 : Vörös Meteor
 1953 : Debreceni Petőfi
 1954 : Csepel
 1955 : Debreceni VSC
 1956 : Csepel
 1957 : Győri ETO
 1958 : Miskolci VSC
 1959 : Győri ETO
 1960 : Bp. Spartacus
 1961 : Bp. Spartacus
 1962 : Bp. Spartacus
 1963 : Bp. Spartacus
 1964 : Bp. Spartacus
 1965 : Bp. Spartacus
 1966 : Ferencváros
 1967 : Bp. Spartacus
 1968 : Ferencváros
 1969 : Ferencváros
 1970 : Bakony Vegyész
 1971 : Ferencváros
 1972 : Vasas
 1973 : Vasas
 1974 : Vasas
 1975 : Vasas
 1976 : Vasas
 1977 : Vasas
 1978 : Vasas
 1979 : Vasas
 1980 : Vasas
 1981 : Vasas
 1982 : Vasas
 1983 : Bp. Spartacus
 1984 : Vasas
 1985 : Vasas 
 1986 : Bp. Spartacus
 1987 : Debreceni VSC
 1988/89 : Bp. Építők
 1989/90 : Bp. Építők
 1990/91 : Hargita KC 
 1991/92 : Vasas 
 1992/93 : Vasas
 1993/94 : Ferencváros
 1994/95 : Ferencváros
 1995/96 : Ferencváros
 1996/97 : Ferencváros
 1997/98 : Dunaferr
 1998/99 : Dunaferr
 1999/00 : Ferencváros 
 2000/01 : Dunaferr
 2001/02 : Ferencváros 
 2002/03 : Dunaferr
 2003/04 : Dunaferr
 2004/05 : Győri ETO
 2005/06 : Győri ETO
 2006/07 : Ferencváros
 2007/08 : Győri ETO
 2008/09 : Győri ETO
 2009/10 : Győri ETO
 2010/11 : Győri ETO
 2011/12 : Győri ETO
 2012/13 : Győri ETO 
 2013/14 : Győri ETO
 2014/15 : Ferencváros 
 2015/16 : Győri ETO 
 2016/17 : Győri ETO
 2017/18 : Győri ETO
 2018/19 : Győri ETO
 2019/20 : Not awarded
 2020/21 : Ferencváros 
 2021/22 : Győri ETO
 2022/23 :

Performances

By club

Performance by counties
The following table lists the Hungarian women's handball champions by counties of Hungary.

 The bolded teams are currently playing in the 2019-20 season of the Hungarian League.
 Dunaferr NK as Dunaújvárosi Kohász KA

Clubs 
Since 1951,  clubs have participated in the Hungarian League. Below the list of Hungarian League clubs who have participated in the first division. The club with the most appearances are the 12-time champions Ferencváros.

Notes
 The teams in bold are competing in the 2017–18 season of the Hungarian League.

Statistics

EHF coefficients

The following data indicates Hungarian coefficient rankings between European handball leagues.

Country ranking
EHF League Ranking for 2021/22 season:

1.  (1)  Nemzeti Bajnokság I (158.33)
2.  (2)  Russian Superleague (117.33) 
3.  (4)  Bambusa Kvindeligaen (115.00)
4.  (3)  Liga Națională (111.86) 
5.  (5)   Ligue Butagaz Énergie (95.17) 
6.  (6)   REMA 1000-ligaen (84.00)

In European competitions

Top scorers by season

 1989/90 –  Éva Erdős
 1990/91 –  Auguszta Mátyás
 1991/92 –  Auguszta Mátyás (2)
 1992/93 –  Erzsébet Kocsis
 1993/94 –  Eszter Mátéfi
 1994/95 –  Bojana Radulovic
 1995/96 –  Zsuzsanna Viglási
 1996/97 –  Zsuzsanna Viglási (2)
 1997/98 –  Florica Buda
 1998/99 –  Rita Deli
 1999/00 –  Rita Deli (2)
 2000/01 –  Ágnes Farkas
 2001/02 –  Auguszta Mátyás (3)
 2002/03 –  Zsuzsanna Viglási (3)
 2003/04 –  Auguszta Mátyás (4)
 2004/05 –  Auguszta Mátyás (5)
 2005/06 –  Beatrix Balogh

 2006/07 –  Judit Veszeli
 2007/08 –  Anita Görbicz &  Renáta Mörtel
 2008/09 –  Anett Sopronyi
 2009/10 –  Tímea Tóth
 2010/11 –  Krisztina Triscsuk
 2011/12 –  Anita Bulath
 2012/13 –  Annamária Bogdanovics
 2013/14 –  Anita Bulath (2)
 2014/15 –  Nerea Pena
 2015/16 –  Katarina Krpež Slezak
 2016/17 –  Krisztina Triscsuk (2)
 2017/18 –  Katarina Krpež Slezak (2)
 2018/19 –  Katarina Krpež Slezak (3)
 2019/20 –  Gréta Kácsor
 2020/21 –  Tamara Pál
 2021/22 –  Csenge Kuczora
 2022/23 –

Notable foreign players
List of foreign players who previously played or currently play in the Nemzeti Bajnokság I

Algeria
  Sarah Khouiled
Angola
  Isabel Guialo
Argentina
  Elke Karsten
Austria
  Patricia Kovács
  Petra Blazek
  Gabriela Rotiș
  Simona Spiridon
Azerbaijan
  Valentyna Salamakha
Belarus
  Elena Abramovich
  Karyna Yezhykava
  Natalia Vasileuskaya
Bosnia and Herzegovina
  Ivana Ljubas
Brazil
  Eduarda Amorim
  Alexandra do Nascimento
  Bárbara Arenhart
  Daniela Piedade
  Samira Rocha
  Tamires Morena
  Karoline de Souza 
  Ana Amorim
  Mariana Costa
  Larissa Araújo
  Ana Luiza Aguiar Camelo Borba
  Jaqueline Anastácio
  Silvia Pinheiro
Bulgaria
  Ekaterina Dzhukeva
Croatia
  Andrea Kobetić
  Katarina Ježić
  Vesna Milanović-Litre
  Ćamila Mičijević
  Sonja Bašić
  Jelena Grubišić
  Dijana Jovetić
  Aneta Benko
  Tea Pijević
  Sanela Knezović
  Ana Turk
  Kristina Elez
  Gabrijela Bartulović
  Kristina Prkačin
  Ivana Lovrić
  Dejana Milosavljević
Czech Republic
  Jana Knedlíková
  Markéta Jeřábková
  Michaela Hrbková
  Petra Valová
  Jana Šustková
  Michaela Konečná
Denmark
  Sandra Toft
  Anne Mette Hansen
  Line Haugsted
  Simone Böhme
  Lotte Grigel
  Camilla Maibom
France
  Amandine Leynaud
  Laura Glauser
  Estelle Nze Minko
  Béatrice Edwige
  Raphaëlle Tervel
  Mariama Signaté
  Gnonsiane Niombla
  Claudine Mendy
  Tamara Horacek
  Camille Aoustin
  Julie Foggea
  Coralie Lassource
  Marie-Paule Gnabouyou
  Chloé Bulleux
  Armelle Attingré
  Catherine Gabriel
  Dounia Abdourahim
Germany
  Emily Bölk
  Dinah Eckerle
  Laura Steinbach
  Anja Althaus
  Alicia Stolle
  Nina Müller
  Susann Müller
  Julia Behnke
  Ann-Cathrin Giegerich
  Silje Brøns Petersen
Iceland
  Arna Sif Pálsdóttir
Italy
  Irene Fanton
Japan
  Mayuko Ishitate
  Yuki Tanabe
  Mana Ohyama
  Natsumi Akiyama
Kazakhstan
  Dana Abilda
Lithuania
  Marija Gedroit
  Laima Bernatavičiūtė
  Sonata Vijunaite
Montenegro
  Jovanka Radičević
  Katarina Bulatović
  Anđela Bulatović
  Ana Đokić
  Itana Grbić
  Marija Jovanović
  Jelena Despotović
  Bobana Klikovac
  Andrea Klikovac
  Sonja Barjaktarović
  Anastasija Babović
  Marina Rajčić
  Tanja Ašanin
Netherlands
  Nycke Groot
  Danick Snelder
  Yvette Broch
  Laura van der Heijden
  Angela Malestein
North Macedonia
  Elena Gjeorgjievska
  Marija Shteriova
Norway
  Katrine Lunde
  Heidi Løke
  Kari Aalvik Grimsbø
  Stine Bredal Oftedal
  Nora Mørk
  Silje Solberg
  Veronica Kristiansen
  Kari Brattset
  Amanda Kurtović
  Linn Jørum Sulland
  Kjerstin Boge Solås
  Emilie Christensen
  Ida Alstad
  Hanna Yttereng
  Malin Holta
Poland
  Joanna Drabik
  Weronika Kordowiecka
Romania
  Aurelia Brădeanu
  Crina Pintea
  Simona Gogîrlă
  Paula Ungureanu 
  Denisa Dedu
  Gabriela Perianu
  Melinda Geiger
  Madalina Zamfirescu  
  Ana Maria Șomoi-Lazer
  Michaela Cracana Blaga
  Daniela Crap
  Nicoleta Alexandrescu
  Georgeta Grigore
  Ildiko Barbu
  Stancuta Guiu
  Nadina Dumitru
  Alina Marin
  Carmen Nitescu
Russia
  Anna Sen
  Anna Punko
  Tatiana Khmyrova 
  Olga Gorshenina
  Yana Zhilinskayte
  Irina Nikitina
  Yulia Khavronina
  Yelena Avdekova
  Darina Shulega
Senegal
  Hawa N'Diaye
Serbia
  Andrea Lekić
  Kristina Liščević
  Sanja Damnjanović
  Dragana Cvijić
  Marina Dmitrović
  Biljana Filipović
  Katarina Tomašević
  Jelena Lavko
  Sanja Radosavljević
  Aleksandra Vukajlović
  Katarina Krpež Slezak
  Tamara Radojević
  Anđela Janjušević
  Jovana Kovačević
  Jovana Risović
  Ana Kojić
  Jovana Jovović
  Jelena Agbaba
  Marija Agbaba
  Aleksandra Stamenić
  Verica Nikolic
  Nada Micic
South Korea
  Ryu Eun-hee
Spain
  Nerea Pena
  Lara González Ortega
  Macarena Aguilar
  Mireya González
  Nuria Benzal
Slovakia
  Katarína Mravíková
  Simona Szarková
  Mária Holešová
  Barbora Lancz
  Nikoleta Trúnková
  Lucia Uhraková
  Alžbeta Tóthová
  Zenetha Tóthová
  Katarina Miklosová
  Katarina Harisová
  Dagmar Stuparičová
  Jana Caltiková
  Monika Rajnohová
  Veronika Habánková
Slovenia
  Ana Gros
  Alja Koren
  Aneja Beganovič
  Maja Vojnović
  Dominika Mrmolja
Sweden
  Linn Blohm
  Jamina Roberts
Tunisia
  Asma Elghaoui
  Ines Khouildi
Ukraine
  Olha Nikolayenko
  Lilia Gorilska
  Tetyana Shynkarenko
  Olena Umanets
  Ganna Siukalo
  Olha Vashchuk
  Tamara Smbatian
  Nataliya Savchyn
  Tatiana Vorozhtsova
  Natalia Horova
  Alesia Semenchenko
  Irina Chernova
  Svetlana Moskovaya
  Olga Kuprichenkova
  Irina Samozvanova
  Viktoria Tsybulenko

Names of the competition
 2016– : K&H női kézilabda liga (K&H liga)

Broadcasting rights
M4 Sport

See also

 Magyar Kupa (National Cup of Hungary)
 Hungarian handball clubs in European competitions
 Hungary women's national handball team

References 

 The history of the Hungarian Leagues
 Tables, Fixtures, Results, Statistics

External links 
Official website

 
1951 establishments in Hungary
 
Women's sports leagues in Hungary
Professional sports leagues in Hungary